Eleftherios Papageorgopoulos is a Greek politician who served as a Minister of State in Vassiliki Thanou-Christophilou's caretaker cabinet from August to September 2015.

Early life and education 

Papageorgopoulos was born in Chalcis on 6 October 1947. He studied law at the University of Athens.

Political career 
Papageorgopoulos served as President of Chalcis Municipality on the City Council from 1 January 1983 to 4 March 1985. From 1 May 1985 to 31 December 1986, Papageorgopoulos served as Mayor of Chalcis.

Papageorgopoulos was first elected as a New Democracy Member of the Hellenic Parliament (MP) for Euboea in the June 1989 election. He was subsequently re-elected in November 1989, 1990, 1993, 1996 and 2000. As an MP, he was a member of the Standing Committee on Economic Affairs and a member of the Commission for the Revision of the Constitution. He served for some time as the parliamentary spokesperson for New Democracy.

On 28 August 2015, Papageorgopoulos was sworn in as a Minister of State in Vassiliki Thanou-Christophilou's caretaker cabinet, serving until 23 September 2015.

Personal life 

Papageorgopoulos is married to Amalia Passa and has one daughter and two sons.

References 

Living people
Government ministers of Greece
1947 births
People from Chalcis
National and Kapodistrian University of Athens alumni
Greek MPs 1989 (June–November)
Greek MPs 1989–1990
Greek MPs 1990–1993
Greek MPs 1993–1996
Greek MPs 1996–2000
Greek MPs 2000–2004
New Democracy (Greece) politicians